An A-bomb (short for atomic bomb) is a nuclear weapon.

A-bomb may also refer to:
 A-Bomb (EP), a 2002 pop punk EP
 A-Bomb (comics), a comics character also known as Rick Jones
 Annie A-Bomb, American artist and performer

See also 
 Atom bomb (disambiguation)